Mikki is a given name. Notable people with the name include:
 Mikki Moore (born 1975), American professional basketball player
 Mikki Osei Berko (born 1973), Ghanaian-born actor
 Mikki Padilla (born 1974), American actress, model and writer
 Mikki Piras, American slalom canoer who competed in the mid-1970s

Fictional
 Mikki (Kiba), a character on Kiba
 Mikki Diamond, a character on Ace of Wands
Mikki Hiiri, the finnish name for Mickey Mouse